Prinze is a surname. Notable people with the surname include:

Freddie Prinze (1954-1977), American stand-up comedian
Freddie Prinze, Jr. (born 1976), American actor
Sarah Michelle Gellar Prinze (born 1977), American actress

See also 

 Prinz (disambiguation)
 Prince (disambiguation)